Syston railway station is a railway station serving the town of Syston in Leicestershire, England. The station is on the Midland Main Line from Leicester to Loughborough,  down the line from London St Pancras.

Early history
The station was opened on 5 May 1840 as a minor intermediate station on the Midland Counties Railway line from Leicester to Nottingham and Derby. Shortly afterwards, the Midland Counties merged with the North Midland Railway and the Birmingham and Derby Junction Railway to form the Midland Railway.

Syston became a junction station on 1 September 1846 with the opening of the Syston and Peterborough Railway to Melton Mowbray, which was extended in 1848 to Peterborough. The north to east curve was opened in 1854.

A replacement station was opened in 1874 when the Midland Main Line was increased from two to four tracks.

Closure
The station closed on 4 March 1968. The station building, having been hidden by fencing for many years, was later dismantled and rebuilt at Midland Railway - Butterley with the help of David Wilson Homes, who erected a housing estate over the old station land in 2006.

Reopening
The station reopened on 27 May 1994 as part of phase one of the Ivanhoe Line.

Express trains do not stop at Syston, as the single platform is on the bidirectional "slow" line, adjacent to the main line. Trains on the line to and from Peterborough do not call at the station either, although it is possible for them to do so.

Network Rail adopted a Route Utilisation Strategy for freight in 2007 which will create a new cross country freight route from Peterborough (East Coast Main Line) to Nuneaton (West Coast Main Line). One of the next stages (around 2013) will create additional lines through Leicester during a re-signalling scheme, during this time Syston station will be rebuilt.

Facilities
The station is unstaffed and facilities are limited although there is a self-service ticket machine for ticket purchases and a shelter on the platform.

There is a small car park as well as bicycle storage available at the station. Step-free access is available to the platform at the station.

Services
All services at Syston are operated by East Midlands Railway using Class 153, 156 and 158 DMUs.

The typical off-peak service in trains per hour is:
 1 tph to 
 1 tph to  via  of which 1 tp2h continues to 

Fast trains on the Midland Main Line pass by the station but do not stop.

The station is closed on Sundays.

References

External links

Railway stations in Leicestershire
DfT Category F1 stations
Former Midland Railway stations
Railway stations in Great Britain opened in 1840
Railway stations in Great Britain closed in 1968
Railway stations in Great Britain opened in 1994
Railway stations served by East Midlands Railway
Beeching closures in England
Reopened railway stations in Great Britain